FAT!SO? is a book by fat activist Marilyn Wann, published in 1998 by Ten Speed Press. It is subtitled Because You Don't Have To Apologize For Your Size!.

It followed a web zine of the same name by Wann.

References

1998 non-fiction books
American non-fiction books
Health and wellness books
Fat acceptance movement
Books about food and drink